Maggie Rose Durante (born May 19, 1988) is an American soul and country music singer. In 2009, Durante signed to Universal Republic as Margaret Durante and released a cover of Kings of Leon's "Use Somebody". A year later, she left Universal Republic and signed to independent Emrose Records, an imprint that used the services of James Stroud's Stroudavarious Records. She charted two singles for Emrose and released her digital EP, Maybe Tonight. Maggie also recorded two songs that were featured in episodes of the Disney Channel's Shake It Up and Good Luck Charlie television series, and were included on the Shake It Up: Break It Down soundtrack album that was released on July 12, 2011. Durante changed her recording name to Maggie Rose in 2012 after signing with Scott Siman's RPM Management.  When Siman expanded RPM to include a mainstream country label, he launched the album with her as the flagship artist with the first single being "I Ain't Your Mama". In 2017, Rose signed to Startruck Records, where she released her 2018 album Change the Whole Thing.

Musical career
Maggie Rose Durante was born in Potomac, Maryland and graduated from Georgetown Visitation Preparatory School. She has been a lifelong singer but began performing at age 16 frequently with The B Street Band, a Bruce Springsteen tribute band. She attended Clemson University but moved to Nashville during her sophomore year in order to pursue a career in music upon receiving encouragement from producer Tommy Mottola, industry mogul and former head of Sony Entertainment (SME).

In 2009, Durante signed with Universal Republic out of New York and released a well-received cover of Kings of Leon's “Use Somebody”.  A year later, she signed to R&J Records where her first release "Mississippi's Crying", entered the Hot Country Songs charts in December 2010 and in June 2011, her music video "Maybe Tonight" debuted in Great American Country's Top 20 Country Countdown videos at No. 1, a first for an independent artist.

She changed her stage name to Maggie Rose, signed with RPM Entertainment and released her first LP. Her debut album, Cut to Impress, features ten tracks highlighting Rose's power packed vocal talent. The album was named by John Caramanica as one of Country music's best releases with the lead single “I Ain’t Your Mama” which was hailed as a  boundary-pushing song showcasing her big, commanding voice with a groovy melody and a spitfire kind of verse structure with a sassy delivery. Her second single, the gut-punching “Better” showcases Maggie's powerful, crisp vocals and serve as a strong follow up to “I Ain’t Your Mama”. “I Ain’t Your Mama” and “Better” were Top 30 singles on Billboard Country Airplay. Cut to Impress was hailed as one of the best listens of the year and began a new chapter in Maggie's career. After visiting the U.S. Troops in the Middle East in 2013, Maggie Rose joined Gary Allan and Sheryl Crow on The Free and Easy Tour. Maggie closed out 2013 having performed in 49 states over the course of 150 shows.

In response to Salad Gate, sparked by the controversial remarks made by radio promoter Keith Hill urging radio programmers to play less female artists while comparing females to tomatoes on a salad, Maggie Rose responded by utilizing social media to launch what she called “Tomato Tuesdays”. She released a new song weekly to her Soundcloud, using the social hashtag #TomatoTuesday, marking her support of females in country music. ”I Want Him Bad” was a standout for its astute songwriting and for combining hip-hop, 80s rock and rootsy, songwriter based singles. Maggie Rose was dubbed by PopDust in the next class of superstar women.

Her next EP, Variety Show released in 2016, mixes country with more progressive pop, with Maggie Rose playing a siren with pop-rock and volume-blasting jams. The breakout single, “Love Me More”, was deemed by Rolling Stone as a genre-busting tune highlighting Maggie Rose's confidence and vulnerability with passionate vocals, soulful honesty and has great songwriting mixed with the pop-leaning production. The single landed on Sirius XM The Highway and the video debuted exclusively on CMT where it was called a little bit pop, a little bit country, a little bit soulful, and 100 percent “Maggie”.

Later 2016, Maggie Rose was featured on a Dallas Davidson track with Outkast's Big Boi and hip-hop producer Mannie Fresh called "Laid Back” a carefree portrayal of downtime which was hailed as one of the most wonderfully unusual mashups. Maggie married Austin Marshall on June 4, 2016, at her home church (Our Lady of Mercy) in Potomac, Maryland. In August 2016 Maggie Rose signed to Narvel Blackstock's Starstruck Management and joined the roster at Creative Artists Agency (CAA).

Maggie released the EP Dreams > Dollars on May 19, 2017 as a personal expression of love and loss. The lead-off single “Body On Fire” dominated streaming platforms, landing Maggie on Spotify's Viral 50 chart upon its premiere. The track debuted on Spotify's New Music Friday (5.5) with immediate adds to the platform's Weekly Buzz and Wild Country playlist. In addition, the song has been featured on SiriusXM's “On the Horizon”, Pandora's New Country playlist and Apple Music’s Breaking Country and Hot Tracks. The title track, “More Dreams Than Dollars” speaks to her experiences as an independent, self-founded musician trying to make it in Nashville. NPR hailed Maggie Rose as “what's next in Nashville” and the Washington Post labels her as “one of music's rising storytellers”.In July 2017, Maggie Rose entered Starstruck Studios with her 13-piece band consisting of touring band members from Brothers Osborne, Kelly Clarkson and Steven Tyler and recorded a live album in one take without overdubs or vocal tuning. She began releasing digital 45s starting in October 2017, with the smoldering “Pull You Through” and the soulful ballad “Just Getting By”. "Pull You Through" landed on Sirius XM radio's “The Highway Top 10”. The digital 45 schedule continued with the March release of “It's You”, a throwback soul ballad that highlights her dynamic vocals with elements of modern pop and R&B, reminiscent of Aretha Franklin. The third digital 45 released in May included “Hey Blondie”, inspired by an interview with Debbie Harry showcasing Maggie Rose's vocal chops with a funkified rhythm section and rock ‘n’ roll sensibility.

Maggie Rose performed at Bonnaroo and the Chevy Breakout Stage at 2018 CMA Fest and was deemed a “Best of CMA Fest” and “Best Hippie Soul” performance. She performed at Spotify's CMA Headquarters for the opening of Blake Shelton's Ole Red during CMA Week. 2018 CMT Awards landed Maggie Rose on several Best Dressed lists including E!

Her performance at 2018 Bonnaroo Art and Music Festival was a deemed a “can’t miss” and was considered one of the highlights at the 2018 music festival. She followed up Bonnaroo by an appearance at the Cannes Lions International Festival of Creativity in France and signing the first-ever joint venture publishing agreement between pop music's Prescription Songs and Nashville-based SeaGayle Music.

Land O’Lakes partnered with Maggie Rose and Grammy-winning songwriter Liz Rose to rewrite “Old McDonald” for a national ad campaign highlighting female farmers. The ad campaign launched on Women's Equality Day, August 26, 2018.

In September 2018, Maggie Rose released the LP, Change The Whole Thing with headlining tour dates in Hollywood, Dallas, Atlanta, and Nashville. Rolling Stone included the album as a “Must Have” along with Prince and Macy Gray and “positions Rose as a gifted and versatile pop-soul belter” in the vein of Bonnie Raitt and Joe Cocker’s Mad Dogs and Englishmen — a convincing assertion that Rose belongs right at the same intersection of musical style.

In September 2018, she made her 50th Grand Ole Opry appearance with Jeannie Seely making the introduction.

In 2021, Maggie released her latest album, Have a Seat. This marks her transition from Country to Soul/R&B.

Discography

Albums

Extended plays

Singles

Album appearances (as Margaret Durante)

Music videos

References

External links

Living people
American women country singers
American country singer-songwriters
American people of Italian descent
Georgetown Visitation Preparatory School alumni
Country musicians from Maryland
R&J Records artists
People from Potomac, Maryland
Singer-songwriters from Maryland
1988 births
21st-century American singers
21st-century American women singers
Singer-songwriters from Washington, D.C.